Sacred Heart Church, popularly known as Iglesia del Seminario, is a Roman Catholic parish church in Montevideo, Uruguay. It was established on 9 April 1891.

Held by the Society of Jesus, it is dedicated to the Sacred Heart. As the building was originally part of a seminary (nowadays a school, Colegio Seminario).

See also
 List of Jesuit sites

References

Cordón, Montevideo
1891 establishments in Uruguay
Roman Catholic church buildings in Montevideo
Jesuit churches in Uruguay
19th-century Roman Catholic church buildings in Uruguay